Montagne d'Ambre National Park is a national park in the Diana Region of northern Madagascar. The park is known for its endemic flora and fauna, water falls and crater lakes.

Geography
Attractions include spectacular waterfalls and several crater lakes. There are numerous rivers and streams and the park is a water catchment area for the town of Antsiranana, which is surrounded by dry, sparse forests and semi-desert with succulent plants. Annual rainfall in the park is  compared with  around the town. The area is named after the deposits of copal, a soft form of amber.

Amber is one of the most accessible parks in northern Madagascar. Bush taxis travel to Joffreville daily from Antsiranana, taking about 45 minutes. On the trip up the mountain to the entrance of the park there are a few small villages and there is a lodge for guests at Joffreville. Living in and around the park are the Sakavala and Antankarana peoples.

Flora and fauna
The forest is isolated from other rainforests by the surrounding dry forests. There are plantations of Eucalyptus and exotic conifers, pines, Araucaria and an invasive alien bush, Lantana camara. Over one thousand species of plants are recorded.

Of the twenty-five species of mammals in the park, endemics include eight species of lemur, the ring-tailed mongoose (Galidia elegans) and the Malagasy civet (Fossa fossana). Thirty-five of the seventy-five species of birds are endemic including the Amber Mountain rock thrush (Monticola sharpei erythronotus) which is only known from one area on the Amber Mountain massif. The park is also known for its amphibians and reptiles such as the Amber Mountain leaf chameleon (Brookesia tuberculata), which is one of the smallest reptiles in the world. There are thirty-five species of frog.

See also
List of national parks of Madagascar
Amber Forest Reserve

References

Sources
Official website (in French)
Wild Madagascar- Amber Mountain

Diana Region
1958 establishments in Madagascar
Amber Mountain
Protected areas established in 1958
Madagascar subhumid forests
Important Bird Areas of Madagascar